The Complete Poland Concerts, 1976 and 1978 is a compilation of the complete live recordings made by the Thad Jones / Mel Lewis Jazz Orchestra in Poland in August 1976 and October 1978.  Two additional tracks from a 1978 Berlin concert round out the album.

Release history
Most of the 1978 Poland concert tracks and the two Berlin tracks were previously released outside Poland on WestWind Jazz releases, A Touch of Class and Body and Soul respectively.  The 1976 Sopot (Jazz Jantar) tracks had previously been available only on a domestic Polish release from PolJazz.

Track listing
Disc 1:
 "Fingers" (T. Jones) – 14:05
 "Thank You" (J. Dodgion) – 6:55	
 "Take a Ladder" (R. Scott) – 8:50
 "Greetings and Salutations" (T. Jones) – 13:50
 "A Child Is Born" – 9:45
 "Intimacy of the Blues" (Strayhorn) – 16:25
Disc 2:
 "Quietude" (Jones) – 7:26
 "Samba Con Get Chu" (Brookmeyer) – 13:35
 "Cecilia Is Love" (Foster) – 7:06
 "I Love You" (Porter) – 5:57
 "And I Love You So" (McLean) – 7:33
 "That's Freedom" (Jones) – 9:14
 "Fingers" – 14:14

Tracks 1.1 - 1.4 previously released on Poljazz LP ZSX 637 
Tracks 1.5 and 1.6 previously released on Body and Soul, West Wind Jazz WW2048 
Tracks 2.1 - 2.3 and 2.7 previously released on Poljazz LP ZSX 697 
Tracks 2.1 - 2.6 previously released on A Touch of Class, West Wind Jazz WW2402

Personnel
 Thad Jones – flugelhorn
 Mel Lewis – drums
 John Mosca – trombone
1976 Sopot: Disc 1 tracks 1-4
 Harold Danko – piano
 Dwight R. Bowman – bass
 Edward I. Xiques – alto saxophone
 Jerry D. Dodgion – alto saxophone
 Arnold L. Schneider – tenor saxophone
 Gregory D. Herbert – tenor saxophone
 Pepper Adams – baritone saxophone
 Al Porcino – trumpet
 Earl Gardner – trumpet
 Frank Gordon – trumpet
 Lynn Nicholson – trumpet
 William M. Campbell – trombone
 Clifford A. Adams – trombone
 Earl P. McIntyre – trombone
1978 Berlin: Disc 1 tracks 5–6; 1978 Warsaw: Disc 2
 Jim McNeely – piano
 Jasper Lundgaard – bass
 Dick Oatts – alto saxophone
 Steve Coleman – alto saxophone
 Rick Perry – tenor saxophone
 Robert Rockwell – tenor saxophone
 Charles Davis – baritone saxophone
 Ron Tooley – trumpet
 Simo Salminin – trumpet
 Irvin Stokes – trumpet
 Larry Moss – trumpet
 Doug Purviance – trombone
 Lolly Bienenfeld – trombone
 Lu Robertson – trombone

References

 The Complete (Live in) Poland Concerts 1976, 1978 (Gambit 69320) at allmusic.com

External links
 Thad Jones & Mel Lewis - 1 (Poljazz ZSX 637) at discogs.com
 Thad Jones & Mel Lewis - 2 (Poljazz ZSX 697) at discogs.com
 A Touch of Class (West Wind Jazz WW 2402) at allmusic.com
 Body & Soul (West Wind Jazz WW 2407) at allmusic.com

2009 compilation albums
2009 live albums
The Thad Jones/Mel Lewis Orchestra live albums